Jean-Pierre Cluysenaar (1811–1880) was a Belgian architect. He is the father of the Cluysenaar family.

Family
Cluysenaar was born in Kampen in the Netherlands as a son of Joannes Kluysenaar and Garidenia Kluysenaar, a Dutch family of architects and engineers. Jean-Pierre Cluysenaar was the father of the Cluysenaar family. His descendants became famous Belgian painters, sculptors and architects. During the United Kingdom of the Netherlands his family settled in the southern Belgian provinces.

Career
Cluysenaar studied architecture at the Royal Academy of Fine Arts in Brussels under Tilman-François Suys. His teacher influenced him in his preference for the architecture of the Italian Renaissance.

Cluysenaer had a talent for business. He took the initiative for some very profitable real estate projects—such as the Royal Saint-Hubert Galleries in Brussels—in which he played the double role of architect and co-financier. He also had a good reputation amongst the Belgian nobility and high bourgeoisie. He received many commissions for designing large town houses (so called "hôtels"), mansions and châteaux. He was always prepared to adapt his designs to the desires and taste of his elite patrons. The many private mansions he built greatly differ in style. Cluysenaar designed elegant Palladian villas, as well as more sturdy neo-Gothic castles.

His stylistic versatility is also apparent in the many public buildings he designed, such as the neo-Renaissance Royal Conservatory in Brussels and the "Tudor style" railway station in Aalst.

List of works
A brief selection of the more than 200 projects in which Cluysenaar was involved:

Châteaux and other private residences

 1844: Hôtel of baron Brugmann, /, in Brussels
 1846: Hôtel Nagelmackers, in Liège
 1851: Château de Bavay, in Forest
 1852–1853: Château Rey, today Town Hall of Drogenbos
 1856–1858: Château of count Ferdinand de Meeûs in Argenteuil near Waterloo
 1859: Mansion of the violoncellist Adrien-François Servais in Halle
 1861: Hôtels de Meeûs, / in Brussels
 1862: De Viron Castle, currently Town Hall of Dilbeek
 1864: Château of Vieux-Sart, in Corroy-le-Grand

Public buildings
 1840: Bandstand in Brussels Park
 1845–1847: Royal Saint-Hubert Galleries shopping arcade, in Brussels
 1846: Concert Hall in Aachen, Germany
 1847: Panorama de la rue Royale stairs and terraces surrounding the Congress Column, in Brussels (demolished)
 1847: Magdalena Market (/) covered market, in Brussels (partly demolished)
 1848: Bortier Gallery shopping arcade, in Brussels
 1851, 1862–1866: Theatre and "Kurhaus" in Bad Homburg, Germany
 Railway stations for the  Société Dendre et Waes in Ternat (1856), Aalst (1856) and Zandbergen (1860)
 1852: Hôpital des Aveugles (home for blind people), near the Halle Gate, in Brussels
 1855–1862: Iron church in Argenteuil (Waterloo)
 1872–1876: Royal Conservatory, /, in Brussels

References
 Fanny Cluysenaar (Madame Veuve Henry Heymans), Les Cluysenaar: une famille d’artistes, Brussels, Weissenbruch, 1928.

1811 births
1880 deaths
Jean-Pierre
People from Kampen, Overijssel
19th-century Belgian architects